The European Defence Agency (EDA) is an agency of the European Union (EU) that promotes and facilitates integration between member states within the EU's Common Security and Defence Policy (CSDP). The EDA is headed by the High Representative (HR/VP), and reports to the Council. The EDA was established on 12 July 2004 and is based in the Kortenberg building in Brussels, Belgium, along with a number of other CSDP bodies.

All EU member states take part in the agency except Denmark. The Danish parliament has adopted a proposal in favour of the country participating in the EDA.

The EDA and the European External Action Service (EEAS) together form the Secretariat of the Permanent Structured Cooperation (PESCO), the structural integration pursued by 25 of the 27 national armed forces of the EU since 2017.

Mission

Tasks
The council established the EDA "to support the Member States and the Council in their effort to improve European defence capabilities in the field of crisis management and to sustain the European Security and Defence Policy as it stands now and develops in the future". Within that overall mission are three functions;
supporting the development of defence capabilities and military cooperation among the European Union Member States;
stimulating defence Research and Technology (R&T) and strengthening the European defence industry;
acting as a military interface to EU policies.
EDA acts as a catalyst, promotes collaborations, launches new initiatives and introduces solutions to improve defence capabilities. It is the place where Member States willing to develop capabilities in cooperation do so. It is also a key facilitator in developing the capabilities necessary to underpin the Common Security and Defence Policy of the Union.

Organisation
Current organigramme is available here

The Agency is monitored and managed in three ways.

Head
The EU High Representative (HR), currently Josep Borrell, acts as the Head of the EDA. The Head is responsible for overall organisation and functioning, ensures implementation of guidelines and decisions and chairs ministerial meetings of Steering Board.

HR Javier Solana was the inaugural head of the EDA, a position which he maintained from 2004 to 2009.

Steering Board
The EDA Steering Board is the agency's decision-making body. The Steering Board is composed of the defence ministers of participating Member States together with a representative of the European Commission and led by the Head of the Agency. The Steering Board is responsible for projects such as the proposed pan-European Future Transport Helicopter.

Chief Executive Officer
The Chief Executive Officer, appointed by the HR, is the agency's head of staff, responsible for supervision and co-ordination of units.

The post of chief executive was vacant from October 2010 until January 2011, when HR Catherine Ashton appointed Claude-France Arnould in succession to Alexander Weis. It was reported that this nomination had been blocked by the Italian government of Enrico Letta which wished to see its own candidate, Alessandra Mussolini, take up the post.

In 2020 Olli Ruutu was appointed Chief Executive ad-interim by the High Representative / Vice President and Head of the European Defence Agency (EDA) Josep Borrell. His mandate began on 1 February 2020 and will run until the appointment of a new Chief Executive.
On 5 March 2020 the EDA Steering Board appointed Jiří Šedivý, former Czech Defence Minister, as new EDA Chief Executive upon recommendation of the Head of the European Defence Agency Josep Borrell. He took office in April 2020.

Directorates
Up until 31 December 2013 the agency was organised into five directorates: Capabilities, Armaments, Industry & Markets, Research & Technology, and Corporate Services.

On 1 January 2019 the agency was reorganised into three directorates:

Directorates

Industry Synergies & Enablers Directorate 
The Industry Synergies & Enablers Directorate supports a range of activities critical to collaborative defence capability development in Europe. On top of leading the work on identifying, together with Member States, Key Strategic Activities (KSA) at EU level, the ISE Directorate is responsible for the effective engagement with industry across the agency's activities and in support of related priorities set by Member States.

The ISE Directorate facilitates work to address the implications of EU legislation and policies for the defence sector: REACH, procurement, funding instruments and the analysis of developments influencing governmental and industrial stakeholders.

Research, Technology & Innovation Directorate 
The Research, Technology & Innovation Directorate promotes and supports defence research at EU level. Based on the Overarching Strategic Research Agenda (OSRA), developed together with the Member States, the Directorate coordinates and plans joint research activities and the study of technical solutions to meet future operational needs.

The RTI Directorate provides support to Member States and to the European Commission for the Preparatory Action for defence research, including its implementation, and the research dimension of the European Defence Fund. The Directorate also ensures the promotion of innovation in defence and the exploitation of synergies at EU level with civil research in dual-use technology fields.

Capability, Armament & Planning Directorate 
The Capability, Armament & Planning Directorate supports the coherent development of the European defence landscape by integrating EDA's involvement in the Capability Development Plan (CDP), the Coordinated Annual Review on Defence (CARD) and the Permanent Structured Cooperation (PESCO). The Directorate also identifies, plans and proposes collaborative opportunities in support of EU capability development priorities and tailored to Member States' needs, representing a coherent approach from priority setting to impact.

The Directorate is in charge of elaborating the Capability Development Plan, based on the analysis of military requirements conducted together with Member States. It also identifies output- oriented EU capability development priorities and coordinates the development of Strategic Context Cases to facilitate the implementation of these priorities.

Budget
The agency is financed by its members in proportion to their Gross National Income. An effect of this is that some nations pay different contributions towards the budgets than others. For example, in 2007 the biggest budgetary contributor was Germany at a cost of €4,202,027 followed by the United Kingdom paying €3,542,487, and France paying €3,347,139.

This budget covers the Agency's operating costs. Individual projects are funded separately.

In its draft budget for the period 2021–2027, the European Commission will allocate €27.5 billion for defence and security.

History

The European Defence Agency is part of several decades of steadily more formal defence cooperation in Europe. Its work is a continuation of the work of the Western European Armaments Organization (WEAO) and the Western European Armaments Group (WEAG) – it effectively represents the transference of their functions from the WEU to the EU framework, and thus continues the decommissioning of the WEU. It may also be seen as growing out of the Eurofighter Typhoon project, and other collaborative defence efforts.

Initially and up until 31 December 2013 the agency was organised into five directorates. On 20 November 2013 a new streamlined organisational structure, listed below, was announced which came into force on 1 January 2014.

At a European Council meeting on 19 December 2013, a European Air Force (EAF) consisting of surveillance drones, heavy transport airplanes, and air-to-air refuelling planes was debated. This EAF was proposed by the External Action Service of HRUFASC Catherine Ashton, and was seconded by President of the European Parliament Martin Schulz. The EAF proposal was supported by France (François Hollande), Spain (Mariano Rajoy), Italy (Enrico Letta), Poland (Donald Tusk) and Germany (Angela Merkel) who together have qualified majority on the council.  The debate was joined with a view presented by NATO Secretary General Anders Fogh Rasmussen, who maintained that "NATO will remain the bedrock of Euro-Atlantic security". Rasmussen's view prevailed on the Council at this time because QMV did not take effect in Council decisions until 1 November 2014.

Relationships with non-EU European countries

The Agency signed Administrative Arrangements with Norway (2006), Switzerland (2012), Serbia (2013) and Ukraine (2015) enabling them to participate in EDA's projects and programmes without exercising voting rights. All Administrative Arrangements are approved by the European Council. The Head of the Agency is responsible for negotiating these arrangements in accordance with directives given by the EDA Steering Board.

A transcript of the European Commission represented by Michel Barnier at the Berlin Security Conference stated that "[after its withdrawal from the union] the United Kingdom will, as is its wish, become a third country when it comes to defence and security issues" and that "the UK will no longer be a member of the European Defence Agency or Europol".

See also

CSDP leadership
 High Representative
 European Council
 Foreign Affairs Council

CSDP structures
Directorate-General for Defence Industry and Space
European External Action Service
European Union Intelligence and Situation Centre
European Security and Defence College
 Permanent Structured Cooperation
 Committee of Permanent Representatives
 Political and Security Committee
 Politico-Military Group
 Military Committee
 Committee for Civilian Aspects of Crisis Management

 European Union Institute for Security Studies
 European Union Satellite Centre

Other structures
 Franco-British Defence and Security Cooperation Treaty and Downing Street Declaration
 NATO Science and Technology Organization
 Organisation for Joint Armament Cooperation (OCCAR)

References

External links

 European Defence Agency Official website (eda.europa.eu)
 Council Joint Action 2004/551/CFSP of 12 July 2004 on the establishment of the European Defence Agency Official website (eur-lex.europa.eu)
 CSDP structure, instruments, and agencies, EEAS website
 European Defence White Paper  EU ISS Document
 A proposed CSDP evolution in the Eurocorps and ESDI in NATO

Defence Agency
Military acquisition
International military organizations
2004 establishments in Belgium
2004 in the European Union
Government agencies established in 2004